The men's triple jump event at the 2009 Asian Athletics Championships was held at the Guangdong Olympic Stadium on November 13.

Results

References
Results

2009 Asian Athletics Championships
Triple jump at the Asian Athletics Championships